Thomas Scott (1766 – 5 November 1799) was an English cricketer who played for Hampshire at the time of the Hambledon Club. He was a specialist batsman who may have been a regular opener, but it is not known if he was right or left-handed.

Life and career
Born 1766 at Alton, Hampshire, the earliest known mention of Scott was when he played for Odiham & Alton against Farnham at the Holt Pound ground in Farnham on Friday 30 July 1784. David Harris was in the same team. Scott was only 17 or 18 at this time.

In John Nyren's The Cricketers of my Time, Scott is listed among the author's "most eminent players in the Hambledon Club when it was in its glory". The period of this list is unquestionably limited to the latter years of Hambledon's existence (i.e., from about 1785) but it nevertheless indicates the esteem in which Scott was held as a player.

As Ashley Mote points out, Nyren includes Scott in his most eminent list but otherwise does not mention him at all. The earliest biographical information about Scott is provided by Arthur Haygarth, who describes Scott as a "very successful batsman indeed for the Hambledon Club, for several seasons". Haygarth believed that Scott was by trade a glover in Alton, his home village.

Scott's tombstone was standing in Alton churchyard in 1857. It confirms his date of death and that he was then 33 years old; his parents were called Thomas and Sarah. The cause of death is unknown.

As Haygarth says, Scott's early death was unusual among the eminent Georgian cricketers, most of whom lived to an old age. Certainly of noted Hambledon players, Scott and Noah Mann (who died in a tragic accident) are the only ones to have died young.

In important matches, Scott made 32 appearances from his known debut in August 1789 to his last recorded match in August 1798.

His best individual performance was in the All-England v Hampshire match at Lord's Old Ground (Dorset Square) on 30 and 31 August 1790. After a very strong All-England had scored 177, Scott opened the Hampshire innings and made 43 in a total of 165. All-England were then dismissed by Harris, who took at least 6 wickets, for just 66. Scott and Jack Small scored the 79 needed and Hampshire won by 10 wickets. Scott made his career highest score of 44* in the process. Arthur Haygarth was very impressed by the Scott/Small partnership and wrote: "Perhaps in no other match has a side gone in for as many as 79 runs to win, and obtain them with out losing a wicket".

Scott was a prolific player in the early 1790s and it is noticeable that he appeared very occasionally after the 1794 season.   The cause of his untimely death is unknown but it is conceivable that he became ill in 1795 and this limited his prowess.

In Scott's final innings in 1798 he was bowled out by John Tufton, whose career also ended that season due to an early death in 1799.

Senior cricket career record

References

Further reading
 G B Buckley, Fresh Light on 18th Century Cricket, Cotterell, 1935
 Arthur Haygarth, Scores & Biographies, Volume 1 (1744–1826), Lillywhite, 1862
 Ashley Mote, The Glory Days of Cricket, Robson, 1997
 Ashley Mote, John Nyren's "The Cricketers of my Time", Robson, 1998

English cricketers
English cricketers of 1787 to 1825
Hampshire cricketers
1766 births
1799 deaths
Hambledon cricketers
Marylebone Cricket Club cricketers
Hampshire and Marylebone Cricket Club cricketers